Espeletia schultzii is a high altitude shrub endemic to the Andes of Venezuela.

References

Millerieae
Flora of South America
Páramo flora
Endemic flora of Venezuela
Taxa named by Hugh Algernon Weddell
Plants described in 1856